Keir Starmer, Leader of the Opposition in the United Kingdom, carried out a reshuffle of his shadow cabinet on 9 May 2021. This followed disappointing results for the Labour Party, including historic defeat in the Hartlepool by-election and the loss of hundreds of councillors in local elections across England.

The major outcome of the reshuffle was the move of Anneliese Dodds, Shadow Chancellor of the Exchequer, which was seen as a reflection of her failure to effectively oppose Rishi Sunak. Rachel Reeves was appointed as the new shadow chancellor and Angela Rayner succeeded Reeves as Shadow Chancellor of the Duchy of Lancaster. Nick Brown stood down as Chief Whip of the Labour Party and Starmer appointed his deputy Alan Campbell to succeed him. Valerie Vaz was sacked as Shadow Leader of the House of Commons and was replaced by Thangam Debbonaire, who in turn was succeeded as Shadow Housing Secretary by Lucy Powell. Starmer also created four new Shadow Secretary of State positions, for the Future of Work, Mental Health, Child Poverty, and Young People and Democracy.

On 8 May, the initial plans were leaked to journalists by an anonymous source saying that he was going to sack Rayner and other senior shadow ministers. This was heavily criticised by Labour members and MPs. Following this backlash, the reshuffle was carried out on 9 May and less extensive than the leaked information said had been planned.

On 10 May, Kim Johnson, the Labour MP for Liverpool Riverside, publicly described Starmer's treatment of Rayner as a "despicable act of cowardice". Confidence in Starmer's leadership and authority was considered by some to have been undermined by the events of 8 to 9 May.

Cabinet-level changes

Junior changes 
The following junior changes were made on 14 May:
 Olivia Blake becomes Shadow Minister for Nature, Water and Flooding
 Sharon Hodgson becomes Parliamentary Private Secretary to the Leader of the Opposition
 Stephanie Peacock becomes Shadow Minister for Veterans
 Carolyn Harris resigned as Parliamentary Private Secretary to the Leader of the Opposition
Peter Kyle becomes Shadow Minister for Schools
Anna McMorrin replaces Peter Kyle as Shadow Minister for Victims and Youth Justice
Andy McDonald becomes Shadow Secretary of State for Employment Rights and Protections
Seema Malhotra becomes Shadow Minister for Business and Consumers
Florence Eshalomi becomes Parliamentary Private Secretary to Angela Rayner
Kate Hollern resigns as Shadow Minister for Local Government
Jeff Smith becomes Shadow Minister for Local Government
Chris Evans replaces Khalid Mahmood as Shadow Minister for Defence Procurement
Ruth Cadbury replaces Mike Amesbury as Shadow Minister for Planning
Bambos Charalambous and Holly Lynch swapped roles
Paul Blomfield leaves the frontbench

Reaction

Alleged sacking of Angela Rayner 

The decision to replace Angela Rayner as Party Chair and Party National Campaign Coordinator was leaked by an unknown source as a sacking and that was received negatively by Labour MPs and members. Reports of the change were leaked on 8 May, leading to accusations that Starmer was attempting to shift blame for Labour's election defeats onto his deputy. Former Shadow Chancellor, John McDonnell, tweeted that he was "scapegoating everyone apart from himself" and demonstrating "a cowardly avoidance of responsibility". Andy Burnham, who had been re-elected as Mayor of Greater Manchester two days prior, also tweeted his disproval by stating that "If it's so I can’t support this". Burnham's statement, along with comments he had recently made that were critical of the party's "London-centric" focus, was perceived by some as a direct attack on Starmer's leadership.

The announcement of the new shadow cabinet was delayed as they always are while the changes were discussed. Although she was ultimately replaced as Party Chair (by Anneliese Dodds) and National Campaign Co-ordinator (by Shabana Mahmood), Rayner's position on the frontbench was seen to have been strengthened, as she was appointed Shadow Chancellor of the Duchy of Lancaster, shadowing prominent Conservative Michael Gove, and given the newly-created role of Shadow Secretary of State for the Future of Work.

Dimissal of Nick Brown 
One of the two shadow cabinet members to leave the Opposition frontbench was Nick Brown, who had served as Chief Whip of the Labour Party under five different leaders. A spokesperson for Brown stated that the decision had been amicable and that he and Starmer had parted "on good terms, with mutual respect". However, this move was criticised as "inept in the extreme" by John McDonnell, who noted Brown's experience, calling him "one of the most experienced and tactically astute chief whips the party has ever had". McDonnell further alleged that the decision was orchestrated by Peter Mandelson, the influential former minister during the New Labour governments.

Other rumoured changes 

The day before the reshuffle, there were rumours leaked that Starmer was planning to demote and replace a number of senior members of his shadow cabinet, including Lisa Nandy, the Shadow Foreign Secretary. This was heavily criticised both inside and outside the Labour Party, as Nandy is seen as one of the more visible and vocal members of the shadow cabinet representing the North of England. It was suggested that she had been disloyal to Starmer and was being demoted as a result. However, Robert Peston of ITV tweeted that the accusations against Nandy appeared to represent "bunker mentality" and that signs of disloyalty had been "invisible" to him.

There was also widespread speculation that Starmer was planning to promote several senior MPs who had previously served in New Labour cabinets and subsequent shadow cabinets. Hilary Benn and Yvette Cooper were tipped to return, indicating an attempt to reintroduce experienced and well-known politicians to the frontbench. Benn had been Shadow Foreign Secretary in Jeremy Corbyn's first shadow cabinet, until June 2016 when he was dismissed. Cooper had been Shadow Home Secretary in Ed Miliband's shadow cabinet and stood down when Corbyn was elected leader in September 2015. Both had served in the New Labour governments of Tony Blair and Gordon Brown.

When the new shadow cabinet was eventually announced on 9 May, Nandy remained in her post, alongside the majority of her colleagues. Neither Benn nor Cooper were appointed as they hold Chairs of Parliamentary Select Committees.

See also 
 Shadow Cabinet of Keir Starmer
 Official Opposition frontbench

Notes

References 

Cabinet reshuffles in the United Kingdom
May 2021 events in the United Kingdom
2021 in British politics
Labour Party (UK)